Football Club Ararat Yerevan, commonly known as Ararat Yerevan, is an Armenian football club based in Yerevan that plays in the Armenian Premier League.

Since 1999, the club is owned by the Switzerland Armenian businessmen Vartan Sirmakes. The badge shows a white eagle standing on a football and is a reference to the club nickname. The badge also displays the name of Ararat in both Latin (Ararat) and Armenian (ԱՐԱՐԱՏ) text.

History
In 1935, a football team was established in Yerevan by Spartak sports society. The first time the team participated in the competitions of the national level. The first trophy of the club was the Armenian SSR Cup in 1940. In the next four years football was not played because of World War II.

In 1944, games of USSR Cup were resumed, and Spartak participated. A match was set up with their main rivals, fellow FC Dinamo Tbilisi. However, the match was not played through the fault of Yerevan. In 1947, the team becomes silver medalist in the second league of the Transcaucasian region. The team finished just one point behind the  ODL from Tbilisi. In this championship, Spartak, in a home match against Tbilisi Wings of the Soviets, showed the best result at the time, beating them by the score 7:1. In Season 1948 Spartak was to start in the first group (the Premier League at the time), but after 30 games along with 15 other clubs had been withdrawn. All 16 clubs have continued to participate in the league below. Spartak have spent the next season in the second group, improved their performance and won the competition in the South Zone. The team won 13 matches out of 18. However, the first place in the zonal group did not guarantee promotion. According to the regulations of the USSR Championship, the winners of zones in the second league should have played each other in the final stage. At this stage, 6 teams participated. Games between the teams went into a circle. After 5 games Spartak has settled on the third place, which ensured the club a place in the first group.

In 1949 at Spartak participated for the first time in the Soviet Top League. The team performed poorly, finishing 12th. In the first two rounds the team lost, but in the 3rd round victory was recorded in a home game against the Air Force (Moscow). To beat the team was able representatives of the second half of the table, and twice on the road. There were three major defeats: the double-0–6 from Moscow Lokomotiv and CDKA, and once 1–6 – from Tbilisi "Dynamo". However, despite the poor performance, the club remained in the top league for next season, as the latter two dropped out of the club, ranked 17th and 18th place in the standings. Cup battles ended at the first stage, against the Dynamo "from Stalinabad. In 1950 season, Spartak began to act more liberated. The first lesion was detected only in the fourth round of the Leningrad "Zenit". The team scored 31 points with team-mates from Kiev, but on goal difference in the Class "B" sunk Spartak. In the Soviet Cup team started with a 1/128 final. Having weak rivals in 1/16-oy stumbled on rivals in the face Dynamo Kiev. In the hard game, which was held in Kiev, Spartak celebrated victory 3–2. In 1/8 final meeting with "Dynamo," Moscow and lost with a score of 0–7.

Between 1960–63 and later in 1966–91, the team participated in the Soviet Top League. In 1973, Ararat won the Top League as well as the Soviet Cup. In 1971 and 1976 (spring) seasons, they were runner-up at the top league, and in 1975 they won the Soviet Cup for the 2nd time.

In total the team participated in 33 Soviet Top League seasons, playing 1,026 matches, of which they won 352, drew 280, lost 394, scored 1,150 goals and conceded 1,306. By 1975 the team participated in the lottery three European Cups. In the last USSR Championship in 1991, the team was finished in seventh place.

Soviet championships

By 1945–47, Ararat swept the Armenian SSR League and by 1949 had won promotion into the Soviet Top League. The team played in the Top League in 1949–50, 1960–63, and 1965–91. In 1971, Ararat finished second in the Top League. In 1973, they won the Top League and the Soviet Cup (in a memorable final game against Dynamo Kyiv). They won the cup again in 1975. In 1971 and 1976 Spring (there were two Soviet championships in 1976 — Spring and Autumn) they were the league runners-up.
In 1974–75 Ararat competed in the European Cup, reaching the quarter-finals before losing to defending and eventual champions Bayern Munich 2–1 on aggregate (0–2 in Munich and 1–0 in Yerevan). Since their debut in the European tournaments in 1972, they have won 16 of their 36 matches with 4 draws.

Modern history
Since the 1991 dissolution of Soviet Union, Ararat has attained the Armenian Championship only once in 1993 and won four silver prizes (1997, 1999, 2000 and 2008) and one bronze prize (1994). In addition, the club has won the Armenian Cup five times (1993, 1994, 1995, 1997 and 2008) and were finalists in 2001 and 2007. They also were very close to taking the Armenian title in 2007, however the unexpected resignation of head coach Varuzhan Sukiasyan changed the atmosphere on the team and the club ended up in fourth place. In March 2008, former coach Varuzhan Sukiasyan returned to take charge of the team again. After failing to take the title from Pyunik in 2008, Varuzhan Sukiasyan left the club.

The club headquarters are located on Agatangeghos Street 2, Yerevan. The club's Dzoraghbyur Training Centre is located in the Dzoraghbyur village of Kotayk Province, at the eastern outskirts of Yerevan.

In August 2016, Arkady Andreasyan became the head coach. However, in August 2017, Albert Safaryan was appointed as a head coach, while Arkady Andreasyan became the club's sports director. As of 2018–2019 season, Abraham Khashmanyan is the head coach of the team.

On 16 July 2018, Ararat Yerevan released a statement against the naming of Ararat-Armenia.

On 29 July 2019, Sergei Bulatov resigned citing family circumstances, with Sergei Boyko being appointed as interim-manager the same day. On 16 September 2019, Boyko resigned with Gagik Simonyan being placed in interim charge. On 6 January 2020, Igor Kolyvanov was announced as the new manager of Ararat Yerevan. On 1 June 2022, Edgar Torosyan left his role as Head Coach after his contract expired, with Aram Voskanyan being announced as his replacement the same day.

Domestic history

Due to the 1995 season being a transitional season, there was no official winner of championship.
Ararat Yerevan were expelled before start of the season..

Ararat in Europe

Biggest Win in UEFA Competition: 17 September 1975, Ararat 9–0 Anorthosis, in Yerevan
Biggest Defeat in UEFA Competition: 23 June 2007, Shakhtyor 4–1 Ararat, in Soligorsk
Club Appearances in UEFA Competition: 12
Player with Most UEFA Appearances:  Aleksei Abramian and  Norik Mesropian – 16 appearances
Top Scorer in UEFA Club Competitions:  Eduard Markarov – 12 goals

Youth academy

Ararat Yerevan run their own youth training academy in the village of Dzoraghbyur at the eastern outskirts of the capital Yerevan. Occupying an area of 48,000 m2, the centre was opened by the club in 2007. It is home to natural-grass as well as artificial-turf training pitches, in addition to an indoor training centre.

Honours
Soviet Top League (1):
1973
Armenian Premier League (1):
1993
Soviet First League (1):
1965
Soviet Cup (2):
1973, 1975
Armenian Cup (6):
1993, 1994, 1995, 1997, 2008, 2020–21
Armenian Supercup (1):
2009
IFA Shield (1):
1978 (shared)
European Cup
Quarter-finalist: 1974–75
European Cup Winners' Cup
1/8 finalist: 1975–76
UEFA Cup
1/8 finalist: 1972–73

Current squad

Ararat Yerevan-2

Ararat Yerevan's reserve squad play as Ararat Yerevan-2 in the Armenian First League. They currently play their home games at the training field with artificial turf of the Dzoraghbyur Training Centre in Dzoraghbyur village near Yerevan.

Also FC Ararat-2 Yerevan played in 1990 Soviet Second League B and 1991 Soviet Second League.

Personnel

Technical staff

Management

Managerial history

See also
The Invincibles (football)

Notes

References

External links
Official website

 
Football clubs in Yerevan
Association football clubs established in 1935
1935 establishments in Armenia
Soviet Top League clubs